Jane Harrison (born 1960) is an Indigenous Australian playwright, novelist, writer and researcher.

A descendant of the Muruwari people of New South Wales, from the area around Bourke and Brewarrina, Harrison grew up in the Victorian Dandenongs with her mother and sister. She began her career as an advertising copywriter, before becoming a playwright, novelist, writer and researcher. Her best-known work is Stolen, which received critical claim and has toured nationally and internationally.

Plays

The Visitors
Harrison's latest play, The Visitors, premiered as a full production in January 2020 as part of the Sydney Festival. It was awarded the prize for Best New Australian Work, Sydney Theatre Awards 2022, and was shortlisted for the Nick Enright Prize for Playwriting at the 2021 New South Wales Premier's Literary Awards.

The Visitors re-imagines the arrival of the First Fleet from the perspective of seven elders meeting on the shores of the harbour.

Sydney Theatre Company and Moogahlin Performing Arts produced a second production of The Visitors at the Sydney Opera House in September / October 2023, directed by Wesley Enoch. 

Victorian Opera (Melbourne) commissioned Harrison to collaborate with composer Christopher Sainsbury to develop an operatic version of The Visitors, staged at Arts Centre Melbourne in October 2023. The opera is on the Victorian Certificate of Education 2023 curriculum.

The Visitors was initially developed as part of the Melbourne Theatre Company Cybec Electric series and the Melbourne Indigenous Festival in February 2014, directed by Leah Purcell, after being work-shopped at the Yellamundie Festival in 2013.

Stolen

Stolen premièred in 1998 at Playbox (now Malthouse Theatre, Melbourne) followed by seven annual seasons in Melbourne, plus tours to Sydney, Adelaide, regional Victoria, Tasmania, the United Kingdom (twice), Hong Kong and Tokyo, with readings in Canada, New York City and Los Angeles. In Sydney, it was performed at the Sydney Theatre Company, directed by Wayne Blair. Stolen is a play about the lives of five Aboriginal people from the "stolen generations". For Stolen Harrison was awarded the Australian Writers' Guild AWGIE Nomination, was co-winner of the Kate Challis RAKA Award, and received an Honourable Mention in the CACS National Awards Individual Category for "An Outstanding Contribution to Australian Culture". Stolen has been studied on the Victorian VCE and NSW HSC English and drama syllabi.

Rainbow’s End
Rainbow’s End premièred in 2005, and toured Melbourne, Sydney, regional Australia, and Japan in 2007, and has had numerous subsequent productions. Harrison was awarded for Rainbow’s End the Drover Award (Tour of the Year) and a Helpmann Awards nomination for Best Regional Touring Production. It was studied on the NSW HSC and from 2013 has been on the Victorian VCE English syllabus. Rainbow's End tells the simple, yet convoluted story of three generations of Aboriginal women; young Dolly, her mother the happy-go-lucky Gladys, and the wise and stern Nan Dear, living in their shanty perched on the flats of the Goulburn River in 1950s regional Victoria. The play was initially directed by Wesley Enoch.

On a Park Bench
On a Park Bench was created through workshops at Playbox and the Banff Playrites Colony. The play was a finalist in the Lake Macquarie Drama Prize.

Blakvelvet
Blakvelvet won the 2006 Theatrelab Indigenous Award.

Novels and short stories

Becoming Kirrali Lewis
Harrison's novel, Becoming Kirrali Lewis, won the State Library of Queensland 2014 black&write! Indigenous Writing Fellowship, was shortlisted in the Prime Minister's Literary Awards 2016, and was Highly Commended in the Victorian Premier's Literary Awards 2016. Becoming Kirrali Lewis is a coming-of-age teen fiction novel about the search by Stolen Generations member Kirrali Lewis for her biological parents, which turns stereotypes on their heads. Becoming Kirrali Lewis was published by Magabala Books in 2015.

Born, Still
Short story, Born, Still, was published by the State Library of Queensland in Writing Black: New Indigenous Writing from Australia, launched in May 2014, and in the anthology Flock published by University of Queensland Press in 2021. Born, Still is a gentle reflection on the death of a daughter before birth.

Born, Still was subsequently re-worked as a play, premiered at the Melbourne Writers Festival in 2018.

Other writing
Healing our communities, healing ourselves was published in the Medical Journal of Australia and won the Dr Ross Ingram Essay Prize in 2010.

Indig-curious; Who can play Aboriginal roles? published by Currency House explores the issues raised by Aboriginal identity in theatre.

Harrison also contributed a chapter to Many Voices, Reflections on experiences of Indigenous child separation, which was published by the National Library of Australia, Canberra.  This work was also related to the theme of the stolen generations.

Harrison has been Festival Director of Blak & Bright - First Nations Literary Festival in Melbourne since 2015.

See also
Stolen Generations

References

External links
  Stolen
  Contemporary Indigenous Plays Rainbow’s End
  Medical Journal of Australia Healing our communities, healing ourselves
  Currency House Indig-curious; Who can play Aboriginal roles?
  La Trobe University Not one size fits all: Understanding the social and emotional wellbeing of Aboriginal children
  National Library of Australia Many Voices: Reflections on Experiences of Indigenous Child Separation

1960 births
Australian non-fiction writers
20th-century Australian dramatists and playwrights
Indigenous Australian writers
Living people
Australian women dramatists and playwrights
21st-century Australian dramatists and playwrights
21st-century Australian women writers
20th-century Australian women writers